The Midland Railway 480 Class was a class of double framed 0-6-0 steam locomotive, designed by Matthew Kirtley for the Midland Railway of Britain.  They were built between 1863 and 1868.

Development
They were a development of the 240 Class, with curved frames, and were themselves developed into the 700 Class.

Ownership
In total, 237 were built. Most survived to London, Midland and Scottish Railway (LMS) ownership in 1923, but only three survived the mass withdrawals of the late 1920s and early 1930s.

Numbering
After the Midland Railway's 1907 renumbering scheme, the numbers were:
 2398–2591 and 
 2672–2686

This totals 209 locomotives, as 28 had been withdrawn between 1902 and 1906.

References

0480
0-6-0 locomotives
Railway locomotives introduced in 1863
Standard gauge steam locomotives of Great Britain
Dübs locomotives
Robert Stephenson and Company locomotives
Kitson locomotives
YEC locomotives